Khanaqin Sport Club, is an Iraqi football team based in Khanaqin, Diyala, that plays in Iraq Division Three and Kurdistan Premier League.

Managerial history
 Khaled Wali Hassan

See also 
 2000–01 Iraqi Elite League
 2001–02 Iraq FA Cup
 2002–03 Iraq FA Cup

References

External links
 Khanaqin SC on Goalzz.com
 Iraq Clubs- Foundation Dates

1975 establishments in Iraq
Association football clubs established in 1975
Football clubs in Diyala